Frank Rawcliffe (10 December 1921 – December 1986) was an English professional footballer who played as a centre forward.

Career
After representing Cheshire Schoolboys he signed for Tranmere Rovers, before then moving to Wolverhampton Wanderers, Colchester United, Notts County, Newport County, Swansea Town, Aldershot, Alessandria and South Liverpool. Having made his debut for Tranmere's reserves aged 14, Rawcliffe was regarded as a precocious young talent. First Division Wolves paid a fee of £3,000 to take him to Molineux in January 1939, where he played alongside Stan Cullis and Billy Wright. Rawcliffe appeared to have a bright future ahead of him until the onset of war derailed his career. A number of brushes with the law followed before he carved out a career in the lower reaches of the Football League in the post-war years. Rawcliffe enjoyed a degree of success in Italy with Serie B Alessandria, who were being coached by Englishman Bert Flatley. Despite Rawcliffe's goal scoring form, his club were relegated at the end of the 1949/50 season and the forward returned to Merseyside to play for South Liverpool. In December 1950, he returned to Alessandria to help with their Serie C promotion push, but managed just four matches before injury struck and he returned to England for good.

Name
Rawcliffe was born in Cardiff as Frank "Dooley", initially taking on his mother's maiden name before reverting to what is believed to be his father's surname, "Rawcliffe". His mother married George Woodward and the family moved to Wallasey when Frank was a boy. During his time in Italy, Rawcliffe was known as Ratcliffe.

References

1921 births
1986 deaths
English footballers
Tranmere Rovers F.C. players
Wolverhampton Wanderers F.C. players
Colchester United F.C. players
Notts County F.C. players
Newport County A.F.C. players
Swansea City A.F.C. players
Aldershot F.C. players
South Liverpool F.C. players
English Football League players
U.S. Alessandria Calcio 1912 players
Association football forwards